Jeziorki  is a village in the administrative district of Gmina Kaczory, within Piła County, Greater Poland Voivodeship, in west-central Poland.

In 2009, a monument was erected to Piotr Konieczka in Jeziorki.

References

Villages in Piła County